The Uruguay national rugby union team (Spanish:  Selección de rugby de Uruguay) represents Uruguay in men's international rugby union nicknamed Los Teros, is governed by the Unión de Rugby del Uruguay. One of the older test sides in the world, Uruguay has qualified five times for the Rugby World Cup, in 1999, 2003, 2015, 2019 and most recently 2023. As of 10 June 2019 they are ranked 17th in the world, and are ranked 3rd in the Americas region, behind rivals Argentina and the United States.

Uruguay has consistently been one of the better fringe international sides in rugby union, having consistently beaten Tier 2/3 competition from across the globe. Uruguay won the South American Rugby Championship in 1981, the only time (pre-2014) that a team other than Argentina won the tournament. They came second on 19 occasions and third the remaining 9. As of 2012, Uruguay has been classified as a Tier 2 nation, which allows them to receive more funding from World Rugby.

Their home stadium is Estadio Charrúa in Montevideo and holds up to 14,000 people. Estadio Domingo Burgueño has also been used for some fixtures in the Americas Rugby Championship.

The nickname Los Teros refers to the national bird of Uruguay, the southern lapwing.

History

1900s – 1960s

Rugby union has been played on Uruguayan soil as possibly as early as the 19th century, with reports of rugby football being played as early as 1865, though the origins of rugby in Uruguay remain controversial. Regardless of whom played the first rugby match in Uruguay, it is clear that rugby was introduced in Uruguay by British immigrants in the 19th century, with the game being more popularized by the Congregation of Christian Brothers, who were of Irish origin. Because of this, Uruguay has one of the oldest rugby cultures outside the British Isles, and one of the most established in the South America.

Uruguay made their official international debut in 1948, in a game against Chile, which Uruguay lost 21–3. Following their debut match, they returned to competition in the Pan American Games, first against the more experienced Argentina, resulting in a 0–62 loss. Uruguay then faced Chile for the second time, defeating them by 8–3. The final match of the competition was a 17–10 win over Brazil. Uruguay thus became runners up in the first unofficial South American Rugby Championship.

Uruguay, after a four years hiatus, played Chile in 1956, who defeated them by 6–3. In 1958, they played for the first official South American Rugby Championship, in a pool of three countries. They first played Chile, this time losing by 9–34. The Teros met again Argentina, having another loss, this time by 3–50. Uruguay managed to defeat Peru (10–6) in the last game.

In 1960, Uruguay faced for the first time one of the powers of the Northern Hemisphere rugby, France XV, losing by 0–61 in Montevideo during a South American tour. Uruguay after this match entered their second South American Rugby Championship. They first won against Brazil in a close game (11–8), then losing to Chile (5–28) and Argentina (3–36) in the closest result to then between both countries.

1970s – 1980s
The 1970s started off with a win over Paraguay in 1971, which was followed by a win and loss against Chile and a win against Brazil. They also played Argentina twice in the 1970s. However, they won all their matches except for those against Argentina, as well as losing one game against Chile and drawing another. However, the next game against Argentina, two years later in 1979, Uruguay came close to defeating the Pumas, going down by just three points, the final score being 19 to 16.

The 1980s started off with a 54 to 14 win over Paraguay, which resulted in a winning streak that was stopped by Argentina in 1983. In 1985, France visited Montevideo for a second time to play the Teros, beating the locals 34–6. Another short undefeated streak occurred over 1987/1989, which was broken by a 19 to 17 loss against Chile. This was followed by a sound loss to Argentina and loss to a new opponent, the United States Eagles.

1990s

The 1990s started off with wins against of Chile, Brazil and Paraguay. This was followed by more wins over their traditional opponents, though Uruguay still lost to Argentina, they also played Canada in a competitive 28–9 loss in 1995. Uruguay played some of the bigger nations such as Argentina, Canada and the United States, although the Canada and U.S. games were a lot closer than some of their previous encounters.

A huge success for them was qualifying for the 1999 Rugby World Cup in Wales. They won their pool fixture against Spain, Uruguay finished third in their pool.

2000–present

Uruguay came within 10 points of Argentina in 2001, and also played nations such as Italy in the same year. Uruguay won most of their matches against their traditional Americas opponents in the early 2000s. Later in 2002, Uruguay defeated Canada, winning 25–23. They followed this up with a 10–9 win over the United States. They again qualified for the 2003 World Cup. They won their pool fixture against Georgia 24–12.

Uruguay's qualification for the 2007 World Cup started in Americas Round 3a, where they were grouped with Argentina and Chile. After losing their first match 26–0 to Argentina, they defeated Chile 43–15 in Montevideo, which saw them enter Round 4. In round 4 they faced the United States, and Uruguay lost on aggregate, and moved onto the repechage round as Americas 4. Uruguay played Portugal in the repechage over two legs — losing the first in Lisbon and winning the second in Montevideo — but lost on aggregate points and failed to qualify.

Uruguay lost the 2011 Rugby World Cup qualification. Uruguay had won the 2009 South American Rugby Championship "A" by defeating Brazil and Chile at the Estadio Charrúa. Uruguay then lost to the United States 22–27 and 6–27. In the repechage, Uruguay defeated Kazakhstan 44–7, but in the battle for the 20th and final spot at the 2011 Rugby World Cup, Uruguay tied Romania at home 21–21 and lost 12–32 in Bucharest.

During the 2015 Rugby World Cup qualifying, Uruguay won the 2013 South American Rugby Championship "A", getting wins at the Estadio Charrúa against Brazil (58–7) and Chile (23–9). In March 2014, Uruguay faced the United States in a NACRA-CONSUR playoff for the last Americas qualification spot. Uruguay tied the home leg 27–27, but lost the away leg 32–13. Uruguay then moved to the repechage, where it defeated Hong Kong 28–3 at the Estadio Charrúa, to face Russia for the 20th and final spot at the 2015 Rugby World Cup. Uruguay qualified for the 2015 Rugby World Cup by defeating Russia by an aggregate score of 57–49 in the two-game series, winning the second game at home 36–27 in front of 14,000 fans at the Charrua Stadium.

Uruguay claimed three wins and two losses at the 2016 Americas Rugby Championship, but ranked fourth out of six because they only scored two bonus points. In 2017 the team also claimed three wins and two losses, finishing third. On 3 February 2018, Los Teros qualified for 2019 Rugby World Cup as Americas 2 after beating Canada in the home-away leg, and started it with a surprising 30-27 win over Fiji on 25 September: it was Uruguay’s first World Cup win in 16 years.

On 30 October 2019, nightclub in southwestern Japan filed criminal complaint against players from the Uruguay team for 2019 Rugby World Cup for allegedly damaging property.

In 2021, Uruguay qualified for the 2023 Rugby World Cup as Americas 1, after a 1-1 series draw with the United States They lost the first game 19-16, but won the second game 34-15. They won on aggregate points (50-34) and are in Pool A with New Zealand, France, Italy and Africa 1.

Record

Overall record

Uruguay has lost all official matches versus Argentina, but has a winning record versus their other South American rivals such as Chile, Paraguay and Brazil.

Regarding tier 2 teams, Uruguay has positive records with Namibia, Spain, Portugal and Russia, and negative records with United States, Canada, Japan, Georgia, Romania and Fiji.

Below is table of the representative rugby matches played by a Uruguay national XV at test level up until 17 July 2022.

World Cup record

Current squad
On 25 October, Uruguay named a 30-man traveling squad for their European tour matches against Georgia, Romania and Tonga.

Head Coach:  Esteban Meneses
 Caps Updated: 19 November 2022

Individual all-time records

Most matches

Last updated: Tonga vs Uruguay, 19 November 2022. Statistics include officially capped matches only.

Most tries

Last updated: Tonga vs Uruguay, 19 November 2022. Statistics include officially capped matches only.

Most points

Last updated: Tonga vs Uruguay, 19 November 2022. Statistics include officially capped matches only.

Most matches as captain

Last updated: Tonga vs Uruguay, 19 November 2022. Statistics include officially capped matches only.

Notable players

 Diego Aguirre
 Rodrigo Capo Ortega
 Alfonso Cardoso
 Alejo Corral
 Diego Lamelas
 Juan Menchaca
 Diego Ormaechea
 Pablo Lemoine
 Juan Campomar
 Joaquin Pastore

Past Coaches
Since the 1999 Rugby World Cup

See also
 Rugby union in Uruguay
 Campeonato Uruguayo de Rugby – Club Championship of Uruguay

References

External links

 Teros XV – Official Site
 Uruguay – Rugbydata.com
 Uruguay Official Matches

 
South American national rugby union teams